The Media Access Project (or MAP) was a non-profit group that promoted the public's interest before Congress and the US court system.  MAP grew out of a 1960s lawsuit against the United Church of Christ and was eventually formed in 1972 in order to advance the rights of the public wanting to participate in the democratic process.  Some of their first cases involved two TV stations in Mississippi not catering to the African American Community, resulting in the stations almost being shut down.  From that era and cases came the thought "that members of the viewing and listening public have the legal right, derived from the First Amendment, to participate in FCC proceedings."  Their most common way of fighting cases was through lobbying. The group suspended operations on May 1, 2012.

Issues addressed

Comcast NBC-Universal deal
On January 18, 2011, cable and internet giant Comcast acquired NBC Universal in a blockbuster deal.  At the time, Comcast was the largest distributor of video services in the United States.  The FCC voted in favor of it by a 4-1 count.  The deal gave Comcast a 51% ownership of NBC Universal, and "For Comcast, the purchase is the realization of its long-held ambition to be a major producer of television shows and movies".  There was some concern about media consolidation, as expressed by Michael J. Copps, commissioner of the FCC.  "Every citizen has a stake here,” given the size of the combined entity. “The lodestar for this review must be the public interest".  The Media Access Project is concerned that the terms of the deal prevent competition, and could result in price gouging due to fewer media sources.  Critics fear that "Comcast will act as a gatekeeper by limiting the ability of independent voices to get a slot on cable distribution systems, or by withholding NBC-Universal content from other platforms and providers".

Media ownership
The issue revolves around the idea that those who control the media control what information people do and don't have access to.  If you have an ownership group that is biased toward, or against a certain argument, or cause, then the media that they own will only give one side of the story.  According to Free Press "But these massive conglomerates — like General Electric, Time Warner and News Corporation — only care about the bottom line, not serving the public interest.  And allowing these few firms too much control over the flow of news and information is dangerous for our democracy".

In 2003, the Media Access Project's lawyers filed a petition with the U.S. Court of Appeals, trying to nullify the FCC's media ownership rules that were going to take effect.  The case was filed on behalf of Prometheus Radio Project of Philadelphia and the Media Access Project wanted to prevent the new media ownership rules until the judicial review was completed.  The court ended up siding with the Media Access Project and struck down the FCC's new media ownership regulations.

On March 23, 2010, the U.S. Court of Appeals lifted a ban that had prevented media companies from owning both a TV station and newspaper in the same region, or market.

Part of the media ownership debate includes that of media concentration.  Media concentration is when a large amount of media outlets are owned by a small number of companies.  According to the MAP website, media concentration not only limits diversity, but also "threatens an outlet’s accountability to local communities, since big companies are often unfamiliar with a community’s specific needs."  In the early 1980s, the Reagan administration started deregulating the broadcasting industries, which led to the trend of media consolidation.  Media Access Project Director Andrew Scwartzman commented: "Deregulation has brought a new breed of broadcaster to whom public service matters less."

Net neutrality

One of the larger issues that Media Access Project concerns itself with is the concept of Net Neutrality.  However a concern that still comes up quite often is that ambiguity in network management may diminish opportunity and innovation within the internet business which in turn may lead to unfair competition.  For MAP the main focus with net neutrality is urging the FCC to ensure that network operators do not block or slow down the transmission of certain types of online content.  One of the bigger cases that lead to current net neutrality rules was in 2007 when internet service provider Comcast was caught directly manipulating or blocking their subscriber's access to the popular file sharing service BitTorrent.  MAP filed a petition with the FCC stating that Comcast had violated several of the agencies policies.

A more recent court case dealing with the current net neutrality rules being challenged by cellular giant Verizon Wireless was thrown out because the company supposedly filed the lawsuit prematurely.  Specifically Verizon Wireless was challenging the Open Internet Framework and felt that the FCC had too broad of an authority for the new regulation of broadband network.  However MAP senior vice president Andrew Schwartzman hinted that Verizon was trying to exploit the system saying “It was a blatant effort to steer the case to a sympathetic court, but the judges agreed that the appeal was prematurity was incurable.”

Spectrum access
Spectrum access refers to the electromagnetic spectrum, which is a set of frequency bands that transmit electronic communications.  According to their website, the Media Access Project has three principles involving spectrum management: “Spectrum belongs to the public, and the law prevents the FCC from turning it into private property; those with exclusive rights to use spectrum must also serve the public interest; and the public is best served by allowing as many people, institutions, and other entities to use spectrum space as technology will permit, the FCC should therefore expand unlicensed uses to the extent technology  allows.”  The MAP argues that allowing greater public access to the spectrum would allow greater social and economic growth.

In 2002, the FCC granted additional flexibility for spectrum use, which led to many public interest groups and wireless carriers to send comments about the policy change.  The comments covered a variety of topics from redefining harmful interference and rural spectrum management.  There was also a debate between whether or not there should be an increase in usable spectrum between public interest groups and wireless service providers.

The FCC allowed a new portion of high-frequency spectrum to be allocated for WiFi networks in 2003.  The spectrum was open to any company and did not require the purchase of a license, but was limited by how much power a device could use to transmit the signal.  Associate Director of the MAP, Harold Feld, claimed that combining a high frequency and low power limits would mean that the allocated spectrum would be too weak its intended purpose.

In 2007, the Media Access Project was a part of the Save Our Spectrum Coalition, whose goal was to allow consumers to use any equipment, content, application or service without interference or discrimination from network providers.  The group wanted network providers to bid on the spectrum through separate affiliates operating under open access conditions.  Later, the Media Access Project claimed that the incumbent companies that already owned spectrum access blocked new competitors from entering the market.  The group stated that if the auction had been anonymous, smaller companies would be more likely to bid against the incumbent companies.

Notable staff

Andrew Jay Schwartzman

Andrew Schwartzman is a media attorney who has worked with MAP since June 1978.  He is currently the Senior Vice President and Policy Director, and previously held the position of President and CEO.  He has worked with MAP since He  now holds the title of Senior Vice President and Policy Director.

Andrew represents MAP before "Congress, the FCC and the courts on issues such as cable TV regulation, minority and female ownership and employment in the mass media,“equal time” laws and cable “open access”.

The Media Access Project's policy director Andrew Schwartzman developed an idea and filed a petition with the FCC in March 2011 “arguing that it should force political groups to disclose information about their top donors when they run political ads.”  Schwartzman noted that the FCC had the ability to put this policy into act for several decades under the Communications Act of 1934.  Previous rules only required disclosure from the group claiming responsibility for the advertisement.  The specifics of the petition are that it “asks the FCC to revise its rules to require groups to disclose financial backers who contribute more than 10% of the group’s budget and on-air disclosures from donors who provide more than 25% of a television commercial’s budget or more than 33% of the cost of a radio commercial.”

Sources

Non-profit organizations based in Washington, D.C.